Joy and Pain is the fourth album by  Bay Area-based R&B group Maze, released on July 18, 1980 on Capitol Records.  The album features the R&B hits "Southern Girl" and "The Look In Your Eyes," along with the title track, all of which remain staples on Urban radio stations.

A version of the title track by Donna Allen made the top 10 in the UK Singles Chart in 1989. Around the same time, Rob Base and DJ E-Z Rock scored an R&B chart hit with their song of the same name, which directly incorporates the chorus from Maze's song. The original Maze version was itself re-released in 1989 in the UK, becoming a minor hit there.

Track listing
All songs were written by Frankie Beverly.

"Changin' Times" 	6:34
"The Look in Your Eyes" 	5:22
"Family" 	5:08
"Roots" 	5:06
"Joy and Pain" 	7:30
"Southern Girl" 	6:49
"Happiness" 	6:46

Personnel
 Frankie Beverly - vocals, piano, synthesizer, rhythm guitar
 Roame Lowry - backing vocals, percussion, congas
 Robin Duhe - bass
 Billy "Shoes" Johnson - drums
 Ron Smith - lead guitar
 Sam Porter - organ, electric piano, synthesizer
 McKinley Williams - percussion, backing vocals
Technical
 John Nowland - engineer
 Rick Sanchez - assistant engineer
 Ginny Pallante - mix engineer
 Dr. Cecil Hale - executive producer

Charts

Singles

References

External links
 Maze Featuring Frankie Beverly -Joy And Pain at Discogs

1980 albums
Maze (band) albums
Capitol Records albums